Doorway is an unincorporated community located in Perry County, Kentucky, United States. Their Post Office closed in 1959.

The origin of the name "Doorway" is obscure.

References

Unincorporated communities in Perry County, Kentucky
Unincorporated communities in Kentucky